Kenneth William Eadie (born 26 February 1961 in Paisley) is a Scottish retired footballer who played for, amongst others, Clydebank, Airdrieonians and Queen of the South during his career.

Career
Eadie played as a striker and spent the longest part of his playing career with Clydebank, hitting 149 goals on his 276 league games; he is the club's all-time leading scorer. Eadie won the 'Daily Record Golden Boot' in 1991, clinching it on the final day of the season with 4 second half strikes in a 7–1 victory over Partick Thistle at New Kilbowie Park which saw him pip Gordon Dalziel and finish the season with 30 goals. Eadie was inducted into the Clydebank Hall of Fame alongside Jim Fallon, Jim Gallacher and Davie Cooper.

Included amongst his time at Queen of the South, Eadie was joint manager along with George Rowe. The management of the pair helped turn round a difficult first season, thanks in large part to the performances of then youngsters Jamie McAllister and David Lilley.

See also
List of footballers in Scotland by number of league appearances (500+)
List of footballers in Scotland by number of league goals (200+)

References

External links
 Ken Eadie profile on the Bankies Archive

1961 births
Airdrieonians F.C. (1878) players
Brechin City F.C. players
Clydebank F.C. (1965) players
Falkirk F.C. players
Kilmarnock F.C. players
Living people
Queen of the South F.C. managers
Queen of the South F.C. players
Scottish Football League players
Scottish football managers
Scottish footballers
Scottish Football League managers
Association football forwards
Footballers from Paisley, Renfrewshire